Sculptured stones is a name applied to commemorative monuments of early Christian date found in various parts of the British Isles and Scandinavia.

They are usually rough-hewn slabs or boulders, and in a few cases well-shaped crosses, bearing lettered and symbolic inscriptions of a rude sort and ornamental designs resembling those found on Celtic scriptures of the Gospels. Their lettered inscriptions are in Latin, Ogam or Scandinavian and Anglican runes, while some are uninscribed. Sculptured stones are usually found near ancient ecclesiastical sites, and their date is approximately fixed according to the character of the ornamentation. Some of these stones date as late as the 11th century. The Pictish stones from Scotland are particularly remarkable for their elaborate decoration and for certain symbolic characters to which as yet no satisfactory interpretation has been found.

See also
Aberlemno Sculptured Stones  
Monifieth Sculptured Stones
Kirriemuir Sculptured Stones

References

Note

External links
Meigle Sculptured Stone Museum
Kilmodan Sculptured Stones

Rock art in Europe
Celtic art
Scandinavian archaeology
Celtic Christianity
Types of monuments and memorials
Medieval European sculptures
Outdoor sculptures
Outdoor sculptures in the United Kingdom
Stones
Viking buildings and structures